Stefan Savić  (born 9 January 1994) is an Austrian professional footballer who plays as a midfielder for Polish club Warta Poznań.

Career
He started his football career in his local club Lieferinger SV and came to the youth academy of Red Bull Salzburg in 2005. From 2010, he played for the second team the Red Bull Salzburg Juniors. In 2011, he played one match in the first squad and was substituted in the halftime by Christoph Leitgeb. On 27 August 2012, he signed for FC Liefering.

In 2015, he signed for the Croatian team Slaven Belupo.

On 6 August 2020, he signed a two-year deal with Polish Ekstraklasa club Wisła Kraków.

References

1994 births
Footballers from Salzburg
Austrian people of Serbian descent
Living people
Austrian footballers
Austria youth international footballers
Association football midfielders
Association football wingers
FC Red Bull Salzburg players
FC Liefering players
LASK players
FC Juniors OÖ players
NK Slaven Belupo players
Roda JC Kerkrade players
NK Olimpija Ljubljana (2005) players
Wisła Kraków players
Tuzlaspor players
Warta Poznań players
Austrian Football Bundesliga players
2. Liga (Austria) players
Croatian Football League players
Slovenian PrvaLiga players
Ekstraklasa players
TFF First League players
Austrian expatriate footballers
Austrian expatriate sportspeople in Croatia
Expatriate footballers in Croatia
Austrian expatriate sportspeople in the Netherlands
Expatriate footballers in the Netherlands
Austrian expatriate sportspeople in Slovenia
Expatriate footballers in Slovenia
Austrian expatriate sportspeople in Poland
Expatriate footballers in Poland
Austrian expatriate sportspeople in Turkey
Expatriate footballers in Turkey